Villains? is the fifth studio album by Irish rock band The Saw Doctors. The CD was released on The Saw Doctors' own record label, Shamtown Records, and has the catalogue number of SAWDOC008CD. The album was dedicated to Paul Cunniffe, who had co-written several songs for the band.

Track listing
"Villains" (Leo Moran) - 5:05
"This Is Me" (Davy Carton) - 2:50
"Still Afraid of the Dark" (Moran/Carton) - 4:00
"Happy Days" (Pearse Doherty) - 3:22
"Bound to the Peace" (Moran/Carton) - 3:28
"Darkwind" (Moran/Carton) - 3:28
"Always Gives Me More" (Doherty/Derek Murray) - 2:38
"I Know I've Got Your Love" (Moran/Carton/Padraig Stevens) - 3:45
"Chips" (Moran/Carton/Stevens/Doherty) - 3:34
"DNA" (Doherty) - 2:58
"Still the Only One" (Stevens) - 3:25

Personnel

Band
Davy Carton: Vocals, guitar
Leo Moran: Guitar, backing vocals
Jim Higgins: Drums
Pearse Doherty: Bass guitar, vocals
Anthony Thistlethwaite: Saxophone
Derek Murray: Keyboards

Guest musicians
Danny Healy: Trumpet
Marilyn O'Connor: Vocals
Maureen Stevens: Vocals
Padraig Stevens: Percussion

External links
The Saw Doctors Official Website

The Saw Doctors albums
2002 albums